Sangrur is a city in Sangrur district of the Indian state of Punjab, India. It is the headquarters of Sangrur District.

Geography
It has an average elevation of 237 metres (778 feet).

Climate

Health services
City has PGIMER Satellite Centre Sangrur for providing medical facilities to citizens. Homi Bhabha Cancer Hospital has been set up at Sangrur by Tata Memorial Centre in collaboration with Govt. of Punjab

Demographics 

At the 2011 census Sangrur Municipal Council had a population of 88,043 with 46,931 males and 41,112 females, giving a gender ratio of 876.  There were 9,027 children 0–6 years old and an overall literacy rate of 83.54% - 87.92% for males and 78.56% for females.

Politics  
Sangrur city is part of the Sangrur Lok Sabha constituency. By-election to Sangrur Lok Sabha constituency is scheduled to be held on 23 June 2022.

Tourist Attractions

Banasar Bagh 
The Banasar Garden of Sangrur City is the most popular picnic spot of the city. It is a building with 12 doors having a marble Baradari. It lies in the middle of a pond, which is accessible through a small bridge. This bridge leads to a marble gate, which is present on the western side of these gardens. Its surroundings comprises four towers, numerous walkways, many plants and trees and a mini zoo. In ancient times, the rulers of Jind State used to spend their summers in the buildings around these gardens.

The Jind State Memorial Museum 
The Durbar Hall, built in or around 1865, in the Banasar Bagh complex is now converted into a museum by the Department of Culture, Punjab Government, which houses a collection of items used by the Jind State Royals. Also it has a collection of arms and armoury displayed.

Shahi Samadhan 
The ‘Shahi Samadhan’ or the tombs of the erstwhile Jind state's rulers. Of the 16 samadhis, 14 were constructed over 125 years ago with bricks and lime-surkhi (brick powder), while two were built around 60–65 years ago with marble, etc. Some of these samadhis are of Maharaja Ranjit Singh's maternal grandfather Maharaja Gajpat Singh and maternal uncle Maharaja Bhag Singh, Maharaja Fateh Singh, Maharaja Sangat Singh, Maharaja Sarup Singh, Maharaja Ranbir Singh and Maharaja Rajbir Singh. All these samadhis are situated in a complex outside the Nabha Gate.

The Clock Tower 
The heritage Clock Tower, constructed in 1885, is located near the Judicial Courts complex. The grand clock tower was commissioned by Maharaja Raghubir Singh from the Canal Foundry Roorkee.

Maha Kali Devi Mandir 
Located on Patiala Gate Market road, the historic temple of Maha Kali Devi Ji was built in 1867. The temple complex houses beautiful shrines of various deities of Hinduism.

Notable people

 Karamjit Anmol, comedian, actor and singer
 Naresh Goyal, founder of Jet Airways
 Bhagwant Mann, current Chief Minister of Punjab
 Muhammad Sadiq, famous punjabi singer
 Udham Singh, Freedom Fighter
 Joginder Singh Ugrahan, farmer leader
 Binnu Dhillon, comedian, actor 
 Rana Ranbir, comedian ,actor 
 Sardar Sohi, actor

References

External links
 Sangrur District website
 Sangrur BSNL Telephone Directory

 
Cities and towns in Sangrur district